The 1950 Gent–Wevelgem was the 12th edition of the Gent–Wevelgem cycle race and was held on 26 March 1950. The race started in Ghent and finished in Wevelgem. The race was won by Briek Schotte.

General classification

References

Gent–Wevelgem
1950 in road cycling
1950 in Belgian sport
March 1950 sports events in Europe